Romanija (Cyrillic: Романија) is a mountain, karst plateau, and geographical region in eastern Bosnia and Herzegovina, including numerous villages and towns, such as Pale, Sokolac, Rogatica and Han Pijesak. Its highest point is Veliki Lupoglav (1,629).

A football club from the neighbouring town of Pale bears its name, FK Romanija.

History

 
 	
The region is north of Sarajevo and local features include the "Romanija Mountains" and "Romanija Planina".
 
Administratively the region was part of the Republika Srpska's region called: Region Sarajevo-Romanija (formerly SAO Romanija).

See also
Glasinac
Ravna Romanija
Podromanija
SAO Romanija

References

Regions of Republika Srpska
Mountains of Republika Srpska
 
Mountains of Bosnia and Herzegovina